Heavy is a news website based in New York City. It operates through its flagship website, Heavy.com, and Spanish-language platform, AhoraMismo.com. The website specializes in "5 Fast Facts" posts, which aggregate facts about trending topics and people.

History 
Heavy.com was founded by Simon Assaad and David Carson in 1999 as a video-focused entertainment site aimed primarily at young men, debuting audiovisual pop culture phenomena like the Kung Faux series. Assaad and Carson said they modeled the highly interactive site on video games. The website was rebooted in 2012 as a news site that reached more than 9 million readers a month as of January 2017.

Assaad continues to serve as CEO, and Aaron Nobel is the editor in chief.

Content 
Heavy.com aggregates news on trending topics.

The Wall Street Journals editorial board cited Heavy.com in an August 2019 story on the mass shooter in Dayton, Ohio, as having "gained access to Connor Betts' Twitter account before it was taken down". Slate cited the website's story on the Quebec City mosque shooting as one of the first to be published in English.

Heavy.com uses information from original sources whenever possible. When citing information from other sources, their reporters must clearly cite them and hyperlink to the original source.

References

External links
 

Internet properties established in 1999
American news websites
American companies established in 1999
1999 establishments in New York (state)